The Turduli Veteres, translated as "Ancient Turduli" or "Old Turduli" were an ancient pre-Roman tribe of present day Portugal, akin to the Calaicians or Gallaeci and Lusitanians.

Location
The Turduli Veteres territory was located south of the estuary of the river Douro, in the north of modern Portugal, being neighbors of the Paesuri. 
Their capital was Langobriga, or Longroiva (now Fiães, Santa Maria da Feira); other Turduli Veteres inhabited regions were Talabriga (situated either in the vicinity of Branca, Albergaria-a-Velha or Marnel, Lamas do Vouga – Águeda) possibly Oppidum Vacca (Cabeço do Vouga – Águeda), and they also lived in the region of Vila Nova de Gaia as evidenced by the two bronze plaques (Tesserae Hospitales) found in Monte Murado in Pedroso.

History
The Turduli Veteres appear to have originated as an off-shot of the Turduli of ancient south-west Iberia. Alongside the Celtici, the Turduli Veteres migrated northwards around the 5th century BC, before settling in a coastal region situated along the lower Douro and Vacca (Vouga) river basins (i.e. north-western parts of present-day Beira Litoral).

Unlike related and neighbouring peoples, the Turduli Veteres did not fall under Carthaginian rule during the later 3rd Century BC. Neither is there any evidence that they took part in the Second Punic War. It is still not clear if they played any significant role in the Lusitanian Wars of the 2nd century BC. Moreover, the Turduli Veteres, unlike the Turduli Oppidani (located in coastal areas of modern Portugal), appear to have remained  independent until the late 2nd century BC and to have resisted attempts by the Lusitani and Gallaeci to incorporate them into their respective tribal federations.

Roman incursions, dominance & Romanization 

Being relatively unaccustomed to interaction with and dominance by other peoples, the Turduli Veteres (like the Lusitani and Gallaeci), bore the brunt of the first Roman forays into north-west Iberia. According to Roman accounts, the Veteres assisted the Lusitani in attempting to resist the Romans; in retaliation, during 138-136 BC, the Roman Consul Decimus Junius Brutus temporarily occupied the Veteres' stronghold of Talabriga and laid waste a significant proportion of the Veteres' lands. In 61-60 BC, the Veteres and the Oppidani were defeated and incorporated into Hispania Ulterior province by the Propraetor Julius Caesar. In 27–13, the Veteres were aggregated into the Roman province of Lusitania during the reign of Emperor Augustus.

See also
Bardili (Turduli)
Turduli
Turduli Oppidani
Paesuri 
Calaicians or Gallaeci
Pre-Roman peoples of the Iberian Peninsula

Notes

References

 Ángel Montenegro et alii, Historia de España 2 - colonizaciones y formación de los pueblos prerromanos (1200-218 a.C), Editorial Gredos, Madrid (1989) 
 Alberto José Lorrio Alvarado, Los Celtíberos, Universidad Complutense de Madrid, Murcia (1997) 
 Francisco Burillo Mozota, Los Celtíberos, etnias y estados, Crítica, Barcelona (1998, revised edition 2007) 
 Jorge de Alarcão, O Domínio Romano em Portugal, Publicações Europa-América, Lisboa (1988) 
 Jorge de Alarcão et alii, De Ulisses a Viriato – O primeiro milénio a.C., Museu Nacional de Arqueologia, Instituto Português de Museus, Lisboa (1996) 
 Luis Berrocal-Rangel, Los pueblos célticos del soroeste de la Península Ibérica, Editorial Complutense, Madrid (1992)

External links
http://www.celtiberia.net
Detailed map of the Pre-Roman Peoples of Iberia (around 200 BC)

Tribes of Lusitania
Ancient peoples of Portugal
Tribes conquered by Rome